For Real! is an Australian comedy television program for children and teenagers which first screened on 10 Shake on 17 October 2020.

Taylor, Maddie, Jet, Lucas and George gather every afternoon in a ramshackle makeshift studio space to produce and record their YouTube show. They try to stay on task and get their show out before they have to be at training, do homework and combat their teen social pressures. Their greatest obstacle is their local Mayor, an ignorant opinionated selfish villain who creates havoc within the community and motivates the teens to Get Involved and stand up for what they believe.

Cast
 Madison Russo as George
 Harrison Aston as Jet
 Hunter Stanford as Lucas
 Melody Kiptoo as Maddie 
 El Smith as Taylor
 Penny Greenhalgh as Mayor Nesbitt

Production
The 37 part series was created by Monica O’Brien for Ambience Entertainment. It was written by Joel Slack-Smith, Penny Greenhalgh, Amy Stewart, Melissa Lee Speyer, Daniel Oates, Monica O'Brien, John Unwin, Hannah Fitzpatrick, Stephen Abbott and Warren Coleman. The series is directed by Keaton Stewart, Joel Slack–Smith and Monica O'Brien with Sue Keating as Series Producers.

See also
 Random and Whacky

References

External links
 
 

2020s Australian comedy television series
2020 Australian television series debuts
Australian children's television series
English-language television shows
10 Shake original programming
Television shows set in Sydney